Andrew Collins may refer to:

 Andrew Collins (actor) (born 1973), British actor
 Andrew Collins (broadcaster) (born 1965), British journalist, scriptwriter, and broadcaster
 Andrew Collins (cricketer) (1972–1999), British cricketer
 Andrew Collins (footballer, born 1965), former Australian rules footballer for Hawthorn
 Andrew Collins (footballer, born 1988), former Australian rules footballer for Carlton
 Andrew Collins (judge) (born 1942), English barrister and judge
 Andrew Collins (politician), American politician in Arkansas

See also
 Andy Collins (disambiguation)